Jardinópolis is a municipality in the state of São Paulo, Brazil, in the outskirts of Ribeirão Preto. The population is 44,970 (2020 est.) in an area of 502 km2. It is 590 m above the sea level. Jardinópolis is known as an important distribution center of mango in Brazil. The town hosts the "Festa do Senhor Bom Jesus da Lapa" (The Kind Hearted Jesus of Lapa's celebration) religious event, which takes place every year between July 27 and August 6.

See also
Antônio da Silva Jardim

References

Municipalities in São Paulo (state)